The Eiger is a mountain in Switzerland.

Eiger may also refer to:

Eiger (Greenland), a mountain in the Halle Range
Eiger Glacier, on the Eiger, Switzerland
Eiger (planet), the name of the exoplanet otherwise called HD 130322 b
Eiger FK, a Norwegian football club
Suzuki Eiger 400, an all-terrain vehicle
Windows Fundamentals for Legacy PCs, codenamed "Eiger", a Microsft operating system

See also

1936 Eiger north face climbing disaster
Eger (disambiguation)
Iger